(born 1 June 1978) is a Japanese song writer and singer. She is signed onto Sony Music Japan.

She debuted with her single  on 21 February 2002, her single 'Life' became the theme song of the TV drama , and she has composed and sung the opening and ending themes to the anime Dennou Coil.

Work

Singles
  (2002-02-21)
 Life (2002-08-07)
  (2003-05-28)
 I will (2003-08-27)
  (2004-02-25)
  (2006-10-01)
 /
  (2008-11-12)
  (2009-02-25)

Albums
 Water Colors (2002-10-09)
 Lunar Soup (2005-07-06)
  (2009-05-20)
 a light, a life (2009-11-25)
 gradation (2010-10-27)

External links
Official website (Japanese)

1978 births
Living people
Japanese women musicians
Musicians from Tokyo
Sony Music Entertainment Japan artists
21st-century Japanese women musicians